Jaana Maarit Savolainen (born 23 January 1964 in Lappeenranta) is a Finnish former cross-country skier who competed from 1984 to 1993. She won a bronze medal in the 4 × 5 km relay at the 1988 Winter Olympics in Calgary and finished 18th in the 5 km + 10 km combined pursuit event at the 1992 Winter Olympics in Albertville.

Savolainen also won a gold medal in the 4 × 5 km relay at the 1989 FIS Nordic World Ski Championships in Lahti. She also won the 10 km event at the Holmenkollen ski festival in 1986.

Cross-country skiing results
All results are sourced from the International Ski Federation (FIS).

Olympic Games
 1 medal – (1 bronze)

World Championships
 1 medal – (1 gold)

World Cup

Season standings

Individual podiums
 2 victories 
 4 podiums

Team podiums

 1 victory 
 8 podiums

Note:   Until the 1999 World Championships and the 1994 Olympics, World Championship and Olympic races were included in the World Cup scoring system.

References

 - click Vinnere for downloadable pdf file

External links
 
 
 

1964 births
People from Lappeenranta
Cross-country skiers at the 1988 Winter Olympics
Cross-country skiers at the 1992 Winter Olympics
Finnish female cross-country skiers
Holmenkollen Ski Festival winners
Living people
Olympic cross-country skiers of Finland
Olympic medalists in cross-country skiing
FIS Nordic World Ski Championships medalists in cross-country skiing
Medalists at the 1988 Winter Olympics
Olympic bronze medalists for Finland
Sportspeople from South Karelia